Paolo Ponzo (11 March 1972 – 24 March 2013) was an Italian footballer who last played as a midfielder for Liguria club Imperia.

Career

Early career
Born in Cairo Montenotte, Liguria, Ponzo started his senior career with Serie D club Vado. In 1991–92 Serie A season, he was signed by one of the largest club in Liguria region, Genoa C.F.C. He played a season with its youth team and left for Montevarchi in 1992.

Serie B teams
After 3 Serie C2 seasons with the Tuscany team, he was signed by Serie B club Cesena. After the club relegated, he left for Serie B club Ravenna in 1997.

He played 4 times for the Emilia–Romagna club and moved to regional and league rival Reggiana in January 1998, in exchange with Sebastiano Vecchiola.

In January 2000, he was signed by Serie B club Savoia from Reggiana, at that time at Serie C1. He played 15 times for the Campania club. Savoia finished as the bottom team and relegated.

Modena
In 2000, he was signed by Modena, his second Serie C1 club. He followed the team promoted to Serie B as Serie C1 champion and promoted to Serie A as Serie B runner-up. From 2002 to 2004, he played 43 Serie A matches. He made his Serie A debut on 14 September 2002, losing to A.C. Milan 0–3. He followed the team relegated back to Serie B in 2004.

Spezia
In 2005, he left for Serie C1 club Spezia, which is from his home region. He won promotion to Serie B again as champion. in 2006–07 Serie B season, he played 27 matches in all competitions, started 20 times. He was on the bench in the relegation play-out.

Later career
In 2007, Ponzo was re-signed by Reggiana. He played 2 seasons for the club in Serie C2/Seconda Divisione. In July 2009, he left to play for Savona from his home province, the Province of Savona. He made 32 league appearances for the club and won promotion back to professional league as Group A champion.

Death
On 24 March 2013 Ponzo died of a heart attack during the Maremontana running race.

Career statistics
Serie A Apps 43 : 2002–04 (Modena)
Serie B Apps 331 : 1995–97 (Cesena), 1997 (Ravenna), 1999-00 (Savoia), 1998–99 (Reggiana), 2001–02 2004–05 (Modena), 2006–07 (Spezia)
Serie C1 Apps 114 : 1999-00 2008–09 (Reggiana), 2000–01 (Modena), 2005–06 (Spezia)
Serie C2 Apps 142 : 1992–95 (Montevarchi), 2007–08 (Reggiana), 2010–11 (Savona)
Serie D Apps 32 : 2009–10 (Savona)
Eccellenza Apps 76 : 1988–91 (Vado), 2011–12 (Imperia)

References

External links
 Football.it Profile 
 La Gazzetta dello Sport Profile (2006–07 season) 
 LaSerieD.com Profile 

Italian footballers
Serie A players
Serie B players
Genoa C.F.C. players
A.C. Cesena players
Ravenna F.C. players
A.C. Reggiana 1919 players
Modena F.C. players
Spezia Calcio players
Savona F.B.C. players
Association football midfielders
People from Cairo Montenotte
1972 births
2013 deaths
Footballers from Liguria
Sportspeople from the Province of Savona